Künneke is a German language surname. It stems from a reduced form of the male given name Konrad – and may refer to:
Eduard Künneke (1885–1953), German composer
Evelyn Künneke (1921–2001), German singer

References 

German-language surnames
Surnames from given names